Sacrificio de mujer (English title: A Woman's Sacrifice) is a Spanish-language telenovela produced by Venevisión International.

Marjorie de Sousa and Juan A. Baptista star as the main protagonists with Mariana Torres and Pablo Azar as co-protagonists. Luis Jose Santander, Flor Núñez, Géraldine Bazán, Arnaldo Pipke and Ximena Duque star as the main villains.

Filming took place in Miami, Florida, in 2010. From April 18, 2011 to June 17, 2011, Univision aired double episodes weekday afternoons at 12pm/11am central. From June 20, 2011 to July 7, 2011, the remaining episodes aired for one hour weekday afternoons. As of September 21, 2011, Venevisión is currently airing Sacrificio de Mujer at 10pm.

Plot
Clemencia Astudillo is a young, humble woman who falls in love with Luis Francisco Vilarte, the spoilt and illegitimate son of Giovanni Tallamonti. After his father's death, Luis Francisco leaves for Europe to enjoy his inheritance and father's businesses without knowing that Clemencia is pregnant. Clemencia tries to inform Luis Francisco about her condition, but his mother Amada, a cold and calculating woman, lies to her that Luis Francisco is in Brazil and wants nothing to do with her. Without any form of income, Clemencia was left in the abject poverty and suffered until one day she woke up in the hospital without her baby with the doctor informing her she cannot have children. Devastated, she seeks comfort in Augusto Talamonti, the doctor who treated her.

Twenty years later, Clemencia is happily married to Augusto with their 3 adopted children: Enzo and the twins Gina and Marife. Young orphan Milagros who was raided up in an orphanage by nuns come to look fora  job at Clemencia's successful company and falls in love with Enzo, Clemencia's son.

Meanwhile, in Europe, Luis Francisco is bankrupt after gambling away his inheritance. Following Amada's advice to go and demand his share of the inheritance from his half-brother Augusto who doesn't know of his existence, he discovers that Clemencia is married to his half-brother Augusto.

Cast
Marjorie de Sousa as Clemencia Astudillo Talamonti/Clemencia Astudillo de Vilarte- Augusto's dedicated ex-wife, mother of Milagros, adoptive mother of Enzo, Marife and Gina, married to Luis Francisco.
Juan A. Baptista as Luis Francisco Vilarte- Milagros' dedicated father, son of Amada Villarte, half brother of Augusto, husband of Clemencia Astudillo Talamonti
Mariana Torres as Milagros Exposito Talamonti/Milagros Vilarte Astudillo de Talamonti- daughter of Clemencia and Luis Francisco, mother of Juan Francisco in love with Enzo Talamonti, wife of Enzo Talamonti.
Pablo Azar as Enzo Talamonti- Adopted son of Clemencia and Augusto, in love with Milagros
Luis José Santander as Dr. Augusto Talamonti- Doctor, husband of Clemencia; adoptive father of Enzo, Marife and Gina, lover of Maria Gracia in love with Lorena Camargo
Flor Núñez as Amada Vilarte- Mother of Luis Francisco, Milagros' grandmother, Clemencia's enemy. Villain. Commits suicide.
Géraldine Bazán as Victoria "Vicky" Lombardo- Villain, Enzo's former girlfriend, Amada's accomplice. Ends up in prison.
Taniusha Capote as Gina Talamonti- villain, later good, in love with Braulio then with her doctor
Taniusha Capote as Marife Talamonti – twin sister of Gina, former novice, in love with Braulio
Cristian Carabias as German Anzola- Criminal, later good. Worked for Amada. Son of Eulalia and Artemio
Pedro Moreno as Braulio Valdes- Police officer, brother of Benito, in love with Gina, then with Marife
Adrian Mas as Benito Valdes- Brother of Braulio
Anna Sobero as Eulalia Anzola- Mother of German
Ariel Texido as Father Anibal- Priest. Killed by Amada.
Arnaldo Pipke as Leoncio- Amada's driver and lover. villain
Beatriz Arroyo as Olga Valdes- Mother of Braulio and Benito
Carmen Daysi Rodriguez as Mayre- Clemencia's secretary, villain
Eduardo Ibarrola as Vilachar- Friend of Augusto
Reinaldo Cruz as Del Risco- lover of Maria Gracia
Fidel Perez Michel as Eliseo Lombardo- Selma's husband, Vicky's father.
Jessica Cerezo as Belinda- Clemencia's secretary
Fernando Carrera as Giovanni Tallamonti-Augusto's and Luis Francisco's deceased father.
Jorge Consejo as Juan Pablo- Father of Milagros' baby, Juan Francisco
Jose Guillermo Cortines as Marcos Castillo- Friend of Luis Francisco
Juan Troya as Dr. Guzman
Tatiana Capote as Lorena Camargo- Enzo's biological mother, Luis Francisco's ex-lover, in love with Augusto Talamonti
Liliana Rodríguez as Alberta- wife of Benito
Lis Coleandro as Sister Teresa
Lyduan Gonzalez as Willy- Criminal, worked for Amada. Friend of German
Mary Kler Mata as Vitelva
Norma Zuñiga as Tomasa- Housekeeper of the Talamonti family
Paloma Márquez as Mitzy- best friend of Gina
Paola Pedroza as Luisita- friend of Milagros
Ramón Morell as Baltasar-  Clemencia's driver
Roberto Javier as Cristian Reyes
Sonia Noemi as Madre Pilar- Deceased administrator of the San Francisco Orphanage killed by Leoncio
Victoria del Rosal as Stefany
Xavier Coronel as Artemio Anzola- German's deceased drunk father, Eulalia's deceased husband.
Ximena Duque as Maria Gracia- Lover of Augusto, mother of his daughter Maria Agustina
Bettina Grand as Selma Lombardo- Mother of Vicky Lombardo, wife of Eliseo Lombardo, villain.
Mirta Renee as Lidia- Hospital nurse. Killed by hitmen on orders from Selma
Nury Flores as Señora
Soledad Esponda as Young Amada Vilarte

References

External links
 Official Site

2011 telenovelas
Spanish-language telenovelas
2011 American television series debuts
2011 American television series endings
2011 Venezuelan television series debuts
2011 Venezuelan television series endings
Venezuelan telenovelas
Venevisión telenovelas
Univision telenovelas
Television shows set in Miami